Shiny Beast (Bat Chain Puller) is the tenth studio album by American band Captain Beefheart and the Magic Band, released in October 1978 by Warner Bros. Records. The album emerged from production difficulties surrounding Bat Chain Puller, an album Captain Beefheart recorded for DiscReet and Virgin Records in 1976. DiscReet co-founders Herb Cohen and Frank Zappa feuded over the production of the album, because Cohen funded the production with Zappa's royalty checks. Captain Beefheart recorded a new album titled Shiny Beast (Bat Chain Puller) due to Zappa withholding the master tapes of the original Bat Chain Puller album.

Background and recording 
After recording Bongo Fury with Frank Zappa, Don Van Vliet formed a new Magic Band and began recording an album titled Bat Chain Puller for DiscReet and Virgin Records. Herb Cohen, DiscReet's co-founder and Zappa's business manager, paid for the album's production costs with Zappa's royalty checks, leading Zappa to end his business partnership with Cohen. Cohen and Zappa each demanded to be paid an advance by Virgin, leading Zappa to withhold the master tapes, for which Cohen sued him.

Shiny Beast (Bat Chain Puller) was recorded from July 6 to August 27, 1978 at the Automatt in San Francisco. Due to the lawsuit, Van Vliet re-recorded four Bat Chain Puller tracks for Warner Bros.: "The Floppy Boot Stomp", "Bat Chain Puller", "Harry Irene", and "Owed T'Alex". The Bat Chain Puller outtake "Candle Mambo" was also re-recorded for the album, as were older unused songs "Ice Rose" (a Strictly Personal outtake formerly known as "Big Black Baby Shoes") and "Suction Prints" (a Clear Spot outtake known as "Pompadour Swamp", no relation to the later song of that name). Four new songs completed the album, these being "You Know You're A Man", "When I See Mommy I Feel Like A Mummy", "Love Lies" and "Tropical Hot Dog Night", the latter being based on a riff of the Bat Chain Puller song "Odd Jobs", which was otherwise not re-recorded. The album was completed with "Apes-Ma", which is the same recording on both versions, due to being sourced from Van Vliet's own home recording. Versions of "Run Paint Run Run" and "The Witch Doctor Life" were attempted during the sessions but not used (they have been bootlegged). They would be finished for Doc at the Radar Station and Ice Cream for Crow respectively.

Style 

The music of Shiny Beast featured a mix of different music styles, similar to Safe as Milk, incorporating elements of pop, spoken word and experimental music. The song "Bat Chain Puller" was based upon the rhythm of Van Vliet's windshield wipers.

Reception 

The album received favorable reviews. Robert Christgau declared Shiny Beast to be better than all Van Vliet's previous albums, writing, "Without any loss of angularity or thickness, the new compositions achieve a flow worthy of Weill or Monk or Robert Johnson, and his lyrics aren't as willful as they used to be."

A contemporary reviewer, AllMusic's Ned Raggett, also praised the album, writing "Shiny Beast turned out to be manna from heaven for those feeling Beefheart had lost his way on his two Mercury albums". Trouser Press called it "one of his best".

In the Spin Alternative Record Guide (1995), the album was ranked 73 on the book's list of the "Top 100 Alternative Albums".

Track listing 
All tracks written by Don Van Vliet except "Owed t' Alex", written by Don Van Vliet and Herb Bermann.

Personnel
Captain Beefheart (Don Van Vliet) – vocals, harmonica, soprano sax, whistling
Bruce Lambourne Fowler – trombone, air bass
Jeff Moris Tepper – slide guitar, guitar, spell guitar
Eric Drew Feldman – synthesizer, Rhodes piano, grand piano, bass
Robert Arthur Williams – drums, percussion
Richard Redus – slide guitar, bottleneck guitar, guitar, accordion, fretless bass

Additional personnel
Art Tripp III – marimba, additional percussion

References

External links
Jeff Moris Tepper's candlebone.com
 The Wire's 100 Records That Set The World On Fire (When No One Was Listening)

Captain Beefheart albums
1978 albums
Warner Records albums